The Qiupa Formation is a Late Cretaceous Maastrichtian geologic formation in Henan Province, central China. It is rich in dinosaur eggs and bones, such as those of carnivorous and herbivorous dinosaurs. The Qiupa Formation is considered to be Late Maastrichtian in age, about 72 million and 66 million years ago.

Geology 
The sedimentation is characterized for the presence of calcareous mudstone interbedded with thin fine conglomerates, brownish red thick-bedded siltstone and parallel and cross laminations. This sedimentation indicates habitats composed by large and shallow meanders with braided river deltas.

Fossil content 
The Qiupa Formation has yielded numerous dinosaur fossils, particularly eggs. The remains of various theropods such as troodontids, dromaeosaurids and oviraptorosaurs have been found. In addition, indeterminate remains of sauropods, ornithopods, ankylosaurs, lizards, turtles and a possible avian bone are reported.

Dinosaurs

Mammals

Squamates

References 

Geologic formations of China
Upper Cretaceous Series of Asia
Cretaceous China
Campanian Stage
Maastrichtian Stage
Mudstone formations
Siltstone formations
Sandstone formations
Conglomerate formations
Fluvial deposits
Lacustrine deposits
Ooliferous formations
Paleontology in Henan